Bolshaya Alexeyevka is a rural locality (a selo) in Khleborodnenskoye Rural Settlement, Anninsky District, Voronezh Oblast, Russia. The population was 234 as of 2010. There are 3 streets.

Geography 
Bolshaya Alexeyevka is located near the Bolshoy and Maly Kurlak Rivers, 36 km northeast of Anna (the district's administrative centre) by road. Bobyakovo is the nearest rural locality.

References 

Rural localities in Anninsky District